The 1996 British motorcycle Grand Prix was the ninth round of the 1996 Grand Prix motorcycle racing season. It took place on 21 July 1996 at Donington Park.

500 cc classification

250 cc classification

125 cc classification

References

British motorcycle Grand Prix
British
Motorcycle Grand Prix